Protein N-terminal methyltransferase (NMT1 (gene), METTL11A (gene)) is an enzyme with systematic name S-adenosyl-L-methionine:N-terminal-(A,P,S)PK-(protein) methyltransferase. This enzyme catalyses the following chemical reaction

(1) 3 S-adenosyl-L-methionine + N-terminal-(A,S)PK-[protein]  3 S-adenosyl-L-homocysteine + N-terminal-N,N,N-trimethyl-N-(A,S)PK-[protein] (overall reaction)
(1a) S-adenosyl-L-methionine + N-terminal-(A,S)PK-[protein]  S-adenosyl-L-homocysteine + N-terminal-N-methyl-N-(A,S)PK-[protein]
(1b) S-adenosyl-L-methionine + N-terminal-N-methyl-N-(A,S)PK-[protein]  S-adenosyl-L-homocysteine + N-terminal-N,N-dimethyl-N-(A,S)PK-[protein]
(1c) S-adenosyl-L-methionine + N-terminal-N,N-dimethyl-N-(A,S)PK-serine-[protein]  S-adenosyl-L-homocysteine + N-terminal-N,N,N-trimethyl-N-(A,S)PK-[protein]
(2) 2 S-adenosyl-L-methionine + N-terminal-PPK-[protein]  2 S-adenosyl-L-homocysteine + N-terminal-N,N-dimethyl-N-PPK-[protein] (overall reaction)
(2a) S-adenosyl-L-methionine + N-terminal-PPK-[protein]  S-adenosyl-L-homocysteine + N-terminal-N-methyl-N-PPK-[protein]
(2b) S-adenosyl-L-methionine + N-terminal-N-methyl-N-PPK-[protein]  S-adenosyl-L-homocysteine + N-terminal-N,N-dimethyl-N-PPK-[protein]

This enzyme methylates the N-terminus of target proteins containing the N-terminal motif [Ala/Pro/Ser]-Pro-Lys.

References

External links 
 

EC 2.1.1